Symplocos nairii is a species of plant in the family Symplocaceae. It is endemic to India. Known to be a shrub or small tree, up to 8 m tall; young branchlets angular, glabrous. Leaves simple, alternate, spiral, 7-10 x 4.5–5 cm, elliptic to obovate, apex obtuse, base subcordate and asymmetric, margin serrate, glabrous; midrib canaliculate above; secondary nerves ca. 8 pairs; tertiary nerves obliquely and distantly percurrent; petiole ca. 0.3 cm long, planoconvex in cross section, glabrous. Flowers axillary, solitary or racemes, 1–2 cm long; flowers sessile. Drupe, cylindrical or ellipsoid, 1.1 cm long.

Description
Branchlets
Young branchlets angular, glabrous.

Leaves
Leaves simple, alternate, spiral; petiole ca. 0.3 cm long, planoconvex in cross section, glabrous; lamina 7-10 x 4.5–5 cm, elliptic to obovate, apex obtuse, base subcordate and asymmetric, margin serrate, glabrous; midrib canaliculate above; secondary nerves ca. 8 pairs; tertiary nerves obliquely distantly percurrent.

Flowers
Inflorescence axillary solitary or racemes, 1–2 cm long; flowers sessile.

Fruit& seed
Drupe, cylindrical or ellipsoid, 1.1 cm long.

References

India biodiversity 

Endemic flora of India (region)
nairii
Endangered plants
Taxonomy articles created by Polbot